National Renewal Party (PNR) was a political party in Guatemala founded in 1978 and dissolved in 1990.

References

Political parties established in 1978
Political parties disestablished in 1990
Political parties in Guatemala